The Seventh All-Ukrainian Congress of Soviets was a congress of Soviets (councils) of workers, peasants, and Red Army men that took place in Kharkiv from December 10 to 14, 1922.

Composition
There were 785 delegates with a ruling vote and 44 with advisory vote. Among the delegates 739 were Communists.

Agenda
 Report of the Ukrainian Sovnarkom (by Mikhail Frunze, as a deputy chairman in the government of Christian Rakovsky)
 Report of the People's Commissariat of Finance of the Russian SFSR
 Summary of work on development in Agriculture
 About situation of industry in Ukraine
 Report of the Central Commission in helping starving and about measures in combating the consequences of famine (Grigoriy Petrovsky)
 Soviet development
 About unification of Soviet republics
 About Red Army
 Elections to the All-Ukrainian Central Executive Committee and delegates for the Tenth Russian Congress of Soviets

Decisions
The congress outlined concrete measures 
 in development of industry
 reconstruction and development of agriculture
 liquidation of consequences of famine

External links
Seventh All-Ukrainian Congress of Soviets at Ukrainian Soviet Encyclopedia

Russian Revolution in Ukraine
7
Political history of Ukraine
1922 in Ukraine
History of Kharkiv
1922 in politics
Communism in Ukraine
1922 conferences